The  Kansas City Command season was the fifth season for the franchise in the Arena Football League. The team was coached by Danton Barto and played their home games at Sprint Center. The Command finished the season 3–15 and did not qualify for the playoffs. It was announced after the end of the season that the Command would cease operations.

Standings

Schedule
The Command had a bye week in the league's opening week, so they began their season at home against the Jacksonville Sharks on March 16. They went on the road to play the Arizona Rattlers for their final regular season game on July 21.

Roster

References

Kansas City Command
Kansas City Command seasons